A Million Lights is a studio album by Christian recording artist Michael W. Smith, released on February 16, 2018. It is his first pop album in over five years and a follow up to Wonder (2010). The album is a new musical direction for Smith and marks a departure from his previous sound.

Background 
Smith began working on this album in January 2017, under the title Revolution. Originally it was set to be released in October 2017 but ultimately was postponed to February 2018. The first single from the album, "A Million Lights", was released on August 11, 2017. The album is a mix of pop music with some EDM influences.

Critical reception

John Palluska from ChristianHeadlines.com gave the album an overwhelmingly positive review, describing it as "one of the best albums to come out in Christian music."

Track listing

Personnel 
 Michael W. Smith – lead vocals, backing vocals (1-7, 11, 12), vocoder (1, 7), acoustic piano (1, 5, 6, 7, 9, 10, 12), organ (1, 7), programming (2, 3, 4, 8, 9, 11, 12), acoustic guitars (6, 11), electric guitars (6, 7), orchestration (12)
 Kyle Lee – acoustic piano (1, 5, 6), synthesizer programming (1, 5, 6, 7), bass (1, 5, 6, 7), drum programming (1, 5, 6, 7), backing vocals (1, 5, 7), electric guitars (5, 7), acoustic guitars (6, 7), Rhodes (6)
 Joe Thibodeau – synthesizer programming (1, 5, 6), drum programming (1, 5, 6)
 Bryan Todd – programming (2, 3, 4, 8-12), backing vocals (9)
 Matt Stanfield – acoustic piano (13), synthesizer (13)
 Paul Moak – synthesizer (13), electric guitar (13), slide guitar (13)
 Casey Moore – electric guitars (1, 5, 6, 7)
 Jonathan Martin Berry – acoustic guitar (3, 8, 9, 11, 12), electric guitar (3, 4, 8, 9, 11, 12)
 Stuart Garrard – electric guitars (5, 7, 13)
 Kris Donegan – acoustic guitar (13)
 Matt Pierson – bass (13)
 Jacob Arnold – drums (5, 6)
 Chris Leidhecker – drums (6, 7)
 Fred Eltringham – drums (13), tambourine (13)
 Brent Milligan – upright bass (10), cello (12)
 Carol Rabinowitz – cello (10)
 Kristin Wilkinson – viola (10)
 David Davidson – violin (10), orchestration (10)
 Conni Ellisor – violin (10)
 Jason Walker – backing vocals (2, 3, 4, 8, 9, 11)
 Vanessa Campagna – backing vocals (3, 8, 9, 12)
 Thad Cockrell – backing vocals (6)
 Calvin Nowell – group vocals (7)
 Debi Selby – group vocals (7)
 Emoni Wilkins – group vocals (7)
 Rebekah White – backing vocals (9)
 Jordin Sparks – lead vocals (10)

Production 
 Tracks 1, 5, 6 & 7 produced, engineered and mixed by Kyle Lee. Recorded at The Manor (Nashville, TN). Mixed at The Void (Franklin, TN).
 Tracks 2, 3, 4 & 8-12 produced, engineered and mixed by Bryan Todd. Recorded at 2220 Record Studios and The Manor (Nashville, TN).
 Track 13 produced and mixed by Paul Moak. Engineered by Devin Vaughan. Assistant Engineers – Brendan Gelais and Zack Zinick. Recorded at The Manor.
 Mastered by Bob Boyd at Ambient Digital (Houston, TX).
 All songs co-produced by Michael W. Smith 
 Executive Producers – Michael W. Smith, Chaz Corzine and Greg Ham.
 Associate Executive Producer – Derek Spirk
 A&R Administration – Keelin Crew
 Photography – Jeremy Cowart
 Creative Director – Brody Harper
 Art and Design – Nick DePartee
 Management – The MWS Group

Charts

References

2018 albums
Michael W. Smith albums